The 46th Daytime Emmy Awards, presented by the National Academy of Television Arts and Sciences (NATAS), honored the best in U.S. daytime television programming in 2018. The ceremony was held on May 5, 2019, at the Pasadena Civic Auditorium in Pasadena, California. Actors and television hosts Mario Lopez and Sheryl Underwood hosted the ceremony for the third consecutive time.

The drama pre-nominees were announced on January 24, 2019, and the standard nominations were announced on March 20, 2019.

Rule changes
Changes were made to the Daytime Emmys rules and procedures to avoid a repeat of the previous year when the NATAS had to rescind the awarding of the Outstanding Guest Performer in a Digital Daytime Drama Series Emmy to Patrika Darbo, after it was determined that she appeared in a prior season of The Bay and entered scenes from multiple episodes for judging, both violations of the submission guidelines. The four network daytime dramas (The Bold and the Beautiful, Days of Our Lives, General Hospital, and The Young and the Restless) had threatened a boycott if no changes to the rules were made.

Winners and nominees

Nominations were announced on March 20, 2019. Winners in each category are listed first, in boldface.

Lifetime Achievement Awards
Judge Judy Sheindlin, Judge Judy
Jacques Pépin

Presenters and performances
The following individuals presented awards or performed musical acts.

Presenters (in order of appearance)

Performers

References

046
2019 in American television
2019 television awards
2019 in Los Angeles
May 2019 events in the United States